Percy Hodge (26 December 1890 – 27 December 1967) was a British athlete, winner of the 3000 m steeplechase at the 1920 Summer Olympics.

The 1920 Summer Olympics were the first to include a (now common) 3000 m steeplechase. This was run on a grass course, unlike later competitions. Percy Hodge was the favourite, easily winning his heat and outrunning the rest of the field. He won the final in a time of 10:00.4, some 100 m ahead of second-placed Patrick Flynn from the United States. Hodge also ran in the heats of the 3000 m team event, in which Great Britain won a silver medal.

Hodge was born in Guernsey, but then moved to Weymouth and Bournemouth, finally settling in Bexhill-on-Sea. He was an AAA champion in 2 miles steeplechase from 1919 to 1921 and in 1923. In 1920 his shoe fell off in the second lap causing him to stop and lose some 100 yards, yet he won the race by a margin of 75 yards. He also finished ninth at the International Cross Country Championships and helped his team to win a first place earlier in 1920.

References

1890 births
1967 deaths
Olympic athletes of Great Britain
British male middle-distance runners
Athletes (track and field) at the 1920 Summer Olympics
Olympic gold medallists for Great Britain
Guernsey people
British male steeplechase runners
Medalists at the 1920 Summer Olympics
Olympic gold medalists in athletics (track and field)